Blue Jay (Jay Abrams) is a DC Comics superhero and a former member of the Champions of Angor, also known as the Justifiers. Blue Jay is a homage to the Marvel Comics character Yellowjacket. He first appeared in Justice League of America #87 (February 1971).

Fictional character biography
The three primary members of the Champions of Angor who survive the trip to Earth were Blue Jay, Silver Sorceress (an homage to the Scarlet Witch), and Wandjina (an homage to Thor). The creation of these characters is a corollary to Roy Thomas' characters within the Squadron Supreme (a Marvel homage to DC's Justice League of America at the time).

After surviving the destruction of his home world of Angor, Blue Jay and his allies come to Earth, in an attempt to disarm its nuclear arsenal and save it from a similar fate. Wandjina seemingly sacrifices his life in a successful attempt to protect the country of Bialya from a pnuclear meltdown (he would return, briefly, a shell of his former self). Blue Jay and the Sorceress are imprisoned by Russian officials. Sorceress escapes back to her homeworld through magic. Blue Jay escapes into the Russian wilderness. He evades multiple Russian patrols and ends up with the League.

The Extremist Vector
While with the League, they confront the Extremists, robotic duplicates of the entities who had destroyed their world. The robots almost do the same to Earth, but are stopped by a combined effort of both teams. It is revealed that Mitch Wacky, a revered member of Blue Jay's world, had created the robotic Extremists but they had gotten out of control. Mitch ran a highly advanced theme park, where the robot Extremists were attractions. Mitch's technological resources had allowed him to survive the nuclear holocaust and he soon makes his way to Earth and a new life. Mitch's subsequent time travel adventure with Kilowog would showcase Blue Jay's old friends and teammates, all analogues of Marvel Comics superheroes.

It turns out that Dreamslayer, one of the Extremists, is not a robotic duplicate, but the real thing.

Leader for a mission
Blue Jay becomes a member of the Justice League under the command of Catherine Cobert. During his tenure in Justice League Europe he spends most of his time wracked with self-doubt.

He is one of the many to fall victim to Starro, but Ice stops this current invasion. He is eventually made the leader of the European branch of the League. He is assigned such by Ambassador Rolf Heimlich, who had been placed in charge of the League by the people of the United Nations. Blue Jay's first mission is to bring back Blue Beetle, Captain Atom, Ice, and Elongated Man. They had all been fired by Heimlich and had teamed together to illegally invade Bialya to uncover the truth behind recent incidents. Inspector Camus discovers the truth behind Heimlich, that he is a mole sent by Queen Bee, the ruler of Biayla. On the flight over, Blue Jay is given valuable leadership advice by Martian Manhunter. The League uncovers the Queen Bee's brainwashing plots in an explosion set by Sumaan Harjavti, who then kills the Queen. The explosion itself also almost kills the League but Ice saves the lives of every superhero and the brainwashing victims by forming an ice shield, but she is not able to save all of the local Bialyans, many of whom die. Blue Jay and the League stay long enough to participate in rescue and relief efforts.

Losing friends
Dreamslayer eventually returns to take over the mind of the Justice League financier, Maxwell Lord. Dreamslayer enhances Max's persuasion power and takes over the populated, sentient, mobile island of Kooey Kooey Kooey. Mitch Wacky is kidnapped to recreate the Extremists, but dies shortly thereafter. During the Justice League raid on the island, the Sorceress takes an arrow in the stomach, fired by a brainwashed native. She dies, but not before neutralizing Dreamslayer. All the Justice League take this hard, but none more so than Blue Jay, for he is now truly the only survivor of his world.

Post-JLE activities
Later, Blue Jay, as a JLE Reserve, becomes involved in power struggles involving the Rocket Reds and the villain known as Sonar.

He is kidnapped by acquisitive aliens, along with dozens of other superhumans. The stowaways, Nightwing and Firestorm, work to release Superman. Their efforts free the hero, along with a few others imprisoned in his specific energy cage. This group includes the hero-for-hire Skyrocket, the mildly mentally unstable Livewire, the invulnerable strategist called the Veteran, and Aquaman II. Doubts about Superman's identity cause a schism in the makeshift team, but they work together to restore their powers, damage the facilities of their alien captors, and free everyone and everything that had been taken. This destroys the effort of an alien entity that calls itself the 'Auctioneer' that had wished to sell off the entities of Earth for a profit.

Due to a mistake by Livewire and the intentional transmissions of the aliens themselves, Blue Jay's efforts, along with the rest of his temporary allies, were broadcast to every television on Earth and to many alien worlds beyond. This makes them intergalactically famous.

Justice League of America
Blue Jay was recently seen again in the pages of Justice League. He was apparently killed by a mysterious unknown villain while attempting to warn the Justice League of a plot against them. However, author James Robinson has suggested that the character is not in fact dead and that he will play a bigger role in the future.

This was confirmed later on, when it was revealed Blue Jay was alive, and held captive by New Gods doppelganger Doctor Impossible. It was later revealed that Doctor Impossible and his team had captured Blue Jay in order to use him as a component in a Multiversal machine that they had planned to use to resurrect Darkseid. This plot went awry when the machine instead gave birth to a new villain calling himself Omega Man. During the subsequent battle between the JLA and Omega Man, Blue Jay was rescued from his prison by Supergirl, who humorously stated to have never heard of him. Once freed, Blue Jay attacked and defeated Owlman, one of his former captors. After the Syndicate members were defeated and sent back to their home universe, Blue Jay chose to fly off into the Multiverse, telling Batman that while he was never respected or considered useful on that world, there might be another Earth out there where he could finally become a true hero.

Heroes in Crisis 
During the Heroes in Crisis storyline, Blue Jay checked into Sanctuary to regain his powers. He was among the heroes killed in a blast caused by Savitar and his corpse was found being eaten by crows.

Powers and abilities
Through unspecified means, Blue Jay is able to shrink himself down to seven inches high. He also grows a pair of bird-like wings while shrinking, allowing him to fly.

Other versions

Earth-8 Blue Jay
The Lord Havok and The Extremists series (2007) features another universe's versions of the Extremists and Champions on Earth-8. The Champions are now part of a group called the Meta-Militia with Tin Man as president of Angor and Americommando as vice president. When Tin Man is killed by Lord Havok, Americommando becomes president with Blue Jay as his vice president. Disgusted by the president's corruption, Blue Jay assists the Extremists in defeating the Meta-Militia, and takes Americommando to stand trial for his crimes.

In his previous identity of Massive Man, the Earth-8 version of Blue Jay was able to increase his height to over 20 feet. It is not known whether this was also true for the main timeline/New Earth Blue Jay.

Justice League Europe
A biologically ten years older Blue Jay is tossed into the far future by a time-based accident. He ends up in the middle of a Legion of Super Heroes recruitment drive. He is rejected but still given a flight ring. He is recruited for the Legion of Substitute Heroes by Polar Boy and taken to their first meeting, where absolutely nothing is planned to happen.

See also
 Justice League Europe
 List of DC Comics characters

References

Characters created by Dick Dillin
Characters created by Mike Friedrich
Comics characters introduced in 1971
DC Comics superheroes
DC Comics characters who are shapeshifters
Fictional characters who can change size
DC Comics characters with superhuman senses